Kouk Pou Commune is a khum (commune) in Bourei Cholsar District, Takéo Province, Cambodia.

Administration 
As of 2019, Kouk Pou Commune has 8 phums (villages) as follows.

References 

Communes of Takéo province
Bourei Cholsar District